James Hughes (1895 – 1 January 1948) was an Irish Fine Gael politician. A farmer, he was elected to Dáil Éireann as a Teachta Dála (TD) for the Carlow–Kildare constituency at the 1938 general election. He was re-elected at the 1943 and 1944 general elections. He died on 1 January 1948 during the course of the 12th Dáil, which was dissolved on 12 January 1948, and no by-election was held for his seat.

References

1895 births
1948 deaths
Fine Gael TDs
Members of the 10th Dáil
Members of the 11th Dáil
Members of the 12th Dáil
Irish farmers